SM U-118 was a type UE II mine-laying submarine of the Imperial German Navy and one of 329 submarines serving with that navy during World War I.

U-118 engaged in naval warfare and took part in the First Battle of the Atlantic.

Career
SM U-118 was commissioned on 8 May 1918, following her construction at the AG Vulcan Stettin shipyard in Hamburg. She was commanded by Herbert Stohwasser and joined the I Flotilla operating in the eastern Atlantic. After four months without sinking any ships, on 16 September 1918, the U-118 scored her first hit. The ending of hostilities on 11 November 1918 led to the subsequent surrender of the Imperial German Navy. U-118 was surrendered to the Allies at Harwich on 23 February 1919.

Beaching at Hastings

Initially, there were attempts to displace the stricken vessel. Three tractors tried to refloat the submarine, and a French destroyer attempted to break the boat apart using her guns. All were unsuccessful, and the closeness of the submarine to the public beach and the Queens Hotel prevented the use of explosives.

The stranded submarine became a popular tourist attraction, and thousands visited Hastings that Easter to see her. She was under the authority of the local coast guard station, and the Admiralty allowed the town clerk of Hastings to charge a small fee for visitors to climb on the deck. This went on for two weeks, during which the town gained almost £300 (UK£  in ) to help fund a welcome for the town's soldiers returning from the war.

Two members of the coast guard, chief boatman William Heard and chief officer W. Moore, showed important visitors around the interior of the submarine. The visits were curtailed in late April, when both coast guard men became severely ill. Rotting food on board was thought to be the cause, but the men's condition persisted and got worse. Moore died in December 1919, followed by Heard in February 1920. An inquest decided that a noxious gas, possibly chlorine released from the submarine's damaged batteries, had caused abscesses on the men's lungs and brain.

Although visits inside the submarine had stopped, tourists still came to be photographed alongside or on the U-boat's deck. The wreck was sold by the British Admiralty to James Dredging Co. on  21 May 1919 for £2,200 (£  in ) and broken up on the beach until 1921. The deck gun was left behind, but was removed in 1921. Some of the ship's keel may yet remain buried in the beach sand.

Summary of raiding history

Gallery

References

Notes

Citations

Bibliography

German Type UE II submarines
Ships built in Hamburg
1918 ships
U-boats commissioned in 1918
World War I submarines of Germany
Maritime incidents in 1919
Shipwrecks of England